Grzegorz Kiljanek (born 9 August 1984 in Nowe Miasto nad Pilicą) is a Polish slalom canoeist who competed at the international level from 2000 to 2012.

He won a silver medal in the C1 team event at the 2008 European Championships in Kraków. At the 2012 Summer Olympics he competed in the C1 event where he finished in 9th place after being eliminated in the semifinal.

World Cup individual podiums

References

Polish male canoeists
1984 births
Living people
Olympic canoeists of Poland
Canoeists at the 2012 Summer Olympics
People from Grójec County
Sportspeople from Masovian Voivodeship
21st-century Polish people